This was the first edition of the tournament.

Ramkumar Ramanathan won the title after defeating Evgeny Karlovskiy 6–1, 6–4 in the final.

Seeds

Draw

Finals

Top half

Bottom half

References

External links
Main draw
Qualifying draw

Bahrain Ministry of Interior Tennis Challenger - 1